The N type carriage stock was a type of steel passenger carriage operated by the Department of Railways New South Wales and its successors from 1939 until the late 1980s.

History
In September 1938, the Department of Railways New South Wales awarded a contract to Waddington,  Granville for 35 steel carriages. They were equipped with forced air ventilation and downward opening windows. Neither were successful and were replaced by more conventional fittings.

The cars were delivered as 5 NUB sets of seven cars, normally marshalled as HFN, FN, FN, BN, BN, FN and HFN. Car numbers were initially 2177-2211 and the cars being numbered sequentially within each set. Cars 2200-2211 were subsequently renumbered to 1738-1748 to accommodate XPT car numbering. The BN cars were first class cars and sat 56 passengers in seven semi-partitioned sections. The FN cars were second class cars and could seat 78 passengers. The HFN cars were second class brake vans and could seat 68 passengers.

In May 1944, they were placed on the Newcastle Flyer services until replaced by HUB sets from 1948. They were also used on the Cessnock Express using set NAB 113 with addition 2 FS carriages (as far as Broadmeadow) until 1963.

On 23rd of June 1964, set 115 was used with an additional 2 FN on Historic Newcastle Flyer record attempt with 3801 setting the new time record of 2hr, 1min and 50sec.

By 1969, five cars were modified from FN to RFN to provide additional buffets for the NSWGR fleet. The modified cars were  lighter and had a capacity of 47 passengers. A number were modified to BAM sleepers for use on longer distance trains which allowed retirement of a number of the older TAM type sleepers.

Over the years, they operated on both express passenger and mail train services. Some of carriages were modified and converted for their new purposes. In 1967, some were converted for use on the Brisbane via Wallangarra service which consisted of 3 carriages from set 112 and one from Set 114, This new set was WAB 130 and consisted of BAM, FNR, CN and ABN which was a spare car. WAB 130 was the only set to permanently contain a sleeper carriage. Another modification happened in June 1970 for use on the Southern Highlands Express becoming WOB 131. This was to replace R type Set 102. They were withdrawn in the late 1980s following the cessation of the Northern and Western Mails.

Fleet Status

Original delivery sets

Subsequent sets formed

The following sets were formed exclusively of N-type carriages subsequent to the dissolution of the original delivery sets.  Other sets were formed with non N-type carriages however these are not shown.

References

See also

Railway coaches of New South Wales